Trèbes is a commune in the Aude department, southern France. It is around 7 km east of the centre of Carcassonne.

History
Located on an important river crossing, Trèbes was originally known as Tresmals (Three Fords) but in 1110 residents petitioned for the name to be changed to Trèbes (Three Goods) since Tresmals could also be parsed as "Three Evils".

In mid-October 2018, Villegailhenc, Conques-sur-Orbiel, and Villardonnel, and Trèbes, along with nearby areas along the river Aude, were devastated when the river flooded after intense rain. 12 people were killed, including a nun.

Incidents
In March 2018, a hostage crisis took place in a supermarket in the town as part of a series of terrorist attacks in the area. Following the resolution of the standoff, five people were dead, including the attacker and a gendarme.

The death toll from flash floods rises to 13 in October 2018.

Population

Gallery

See also
Communes of the Aude department

References

External links
Official website

Communes of Aude
Aude communes articles needing translation from French Wikipedia